The 2010 Holiday Bowl (also known as Bridgepoint Education Holiday Bowl) was the thirty-third edition of the college football bowl game and was played at Qualcomm Stadium in San Diego, California.  The game started at 7:00 PM US PST on Thursday, December 30, 2010, and was a bowl rematch featuring the Nebraska Cornhuskers against the Washington Huskies. The game was telecast on ESPN. The Washington Huskies won 19–7. San Diego’s Bridgepoint Education became the new title sponsor of the Holiday Bowl.

Teams

Nebraska

Nebraska entered the game at 10–3 on the season and was the Big 12 North Champions.  The Huskers came close to a BCS Bowl bid for the second straight season but a midseason injury to quarterback Taylor Martinez brought the offense back down to earth.  This was the second straight season that the Cornhuskers played in the Holiday Bowl.  The previous season they shut out Arizona 33–0.  It was the third time in school history that Nebraska played in the Holiday Bowl as they also participated in the 1998 game against Arizona-a game they lost 23–20.

Washington

The Huskies ran off three consecutive wins to become bowl eligible for the first time since 2002.  Led by quarterback Jake Locker, Washington boasted one of the better offenses in the country.  However, the defense had been less than solid.  This was the Huskies' fourth appearance in the Holiday Bowl and their first win in the game.  They lost to Colorado, Kansas State and Texas in 1996, 1999, and 2001 respectively (Colorado is now in the same conference as Washington).

Game summary

Scoring summary

Statistics

Game notes
The two schools have played each other on eight previous occasions including earlier that season. Nebraska was a blowout winner in the September 2010 matchup between the two teams by a score of 56–21. Going into this game, the Huskers held an advantage in the overall series 4–3–1. Following the Washington victory, the series is again tied with the series standing at 4–4–1. This was the first time that the two schools had met in a bowl game.

References

External links
 ESPN Recap

Holiday Bowl
Holiday Bowl
Nebraska Cornhuskers football bowl games
Washington Huskies football bowl games
Holiday Bowl
December 2010 sports events in the United States